Grendelius is a genus of platypterygiine ophthalmosaurid ichthyosaur from the Late Jurassic (Kimmeridgian-Tithonian) of the UK and European Russia.

Taxonomy

The type species, Grendelius mordax, was described in 1976 on the basis of CAMSM J.68516, a complete skull with associated postcranial elements from the Kimmeridge Clay of England. Later, it was reassigned to Brachypterygius because differences between the two species were considered insufficient to warrant separate genera, or even species.

Efimov, 1998 named a new genus of ichthyosaur, Otschevia pseudoscythica on the basis of a single specimen (the holotype) from the Pseudoscythia Zone (late Tithonian stage of the Late Jurassic) of Ulyanovsk, Volga region, Russia. Later, Arkangelsky, 1998 described Brachypterygius zhuravlevi from a Tithonian-stage locality in Saratov, Russia, subsequently referring it to Otschevia zhuravlevi. Maisch & Matzke, 2000 considered both Russian taxa to be synonyms of each other, and referred the new combination B. pseudoscythicus to Brachypterygius. Thus, Grendelius and Otschevia are considered to be junior synonyms of Brachypterygius. Arkhangelsky named Otschevia alekseevi in 2001, also from the Late Jurassic of Russia. While McGowan and Motani (2003) considered these Russian taxa to be junior synonyms of B. extremus, Maisch (2010) retained them, and B. mordax, as separate species. A paper published in 2015 found Grendelius to be generically distinct from the Brachypterygius type species and more derived within Platypterygiinae, being more closely related to Platypterygius than to Brachypterygius. Otschevia was considered to be a junior synonym of Grendelius.

The following cladogram shows a possible phylogenetic position of Grendelius in Ophthalmosauridae according to the analysis performed by Zverkov and Jacobs (2020).

See also

 List of ichthyosaurs
 Timeline of ichthyosaur research

References

Fossil taxa described in 1976
Late Jurassic ichthyosaurs
Late Jurassic reptiles of Europe
Ichthyosauromorph genera